Major General Kenneth Perkins  (15 August 1926 – 23 October 2009) was a British Army officer who became commander of the Sultan of Oman's Armed Forces taking over from General Sir Timothy Creasey.

His career highlights included:

On 1 November 1947 Ken Perkins was promoted 2nd Lieutenant to Lieutenant.
On 15 August 1953 Ken Perkins was promoted to Captain.
On 25 October 1955 Captain Ken Perkins DFC (Army number 369841) was awarded the MBE.
In 1958 Ken Perkins attended the Pakistani Army staff College in Quetta.
On 30 June 1967 Ken Perkins was promoted lieutenant colonel.
Between December 1973 and January 1975 Director of Defence Operational Plans(Defence Operations) as a brigadier.
On 21 April 1975 Brigadier (Acting Major General) Perkins was confirmed as Major General, with seniority 8 April 1974.
Major General Perkins was Commander Sultan of Oman's Armed Force 1975–1977. 
On 16 June 1977 Major General Perkins appointed Assistant Chief of Defence Staff (Operations), Ministry of Defence; and nearing the end of his time in post in 1980 he deployed to the infant state of Zimbabwe to try and assist in the integration of the new Zimbabwean Armed Forces, bringing in former anti-Rhodesian rebels with the residual military.
The 1977 Silver Jubilee and Birthday Honours made Ken Perkins a Companion of the Bath (CB)
At the end of his military career he held the post of Director of Military Assistance Overseas from April 1980 to April 1982.

Gallery

References

British Army major generals
1926 births
2009 deaths
Royal Artillery officers
Military of Oman
British military personnel of the Dhofar Rebellion
British military personnel of The Troubles (Northern Ireland)